Lincolnshire is a ceremonial county in England, United Kingdom. The ceremonial county is a combination of the non-metropolitan county of Lincolnshire and two unitary authority areas in the north. The non-metropolitan county is governed by the Lincolnshire County Council, which is Conservative controlled, and further divided into seven district councils.

Two further districts - North East Lincolnshire and North Lincolnshire - are unitary authorities because they were previously districts of the controversial Humberside county from 1974. In 1996, Humberside was abolished along with its county council. However some services in those districts are still shared with the East Riding of Yorkshire ceremonial county, rather than the rest Lincolnshire.

Lincolnshire is represented by 11 Members of Parliament (MPs). As of the 2019 general election, all 11 constituencies are represented by the Conservative Party.

UK Parliament 
Lincolnshire is represented by 11 Members of Parliament (MPs). As of the 2019 general election, all 11 constituencies are represented by the Conservative Party.

Local government

Non-metropolitan county 

The Conservatives control the county council, with 58 of the 70 seats. North Lincolnshire and North East Lincolnshire are unitary authorities and do not form part of the non-metropolitan county of Lincolnshire.

2009 County Council elections 
The Conservative Party comfortably controlled the County Council after the 2009 local elections, in which they increased their majority to 43 seats. The Labour Party lost a total of 15 seats including 7 in Lincoln, whilst the Liberal Democrats lost three. The Lincolnshire Independents gained a total of four seats, although one of their number moved to the Conservative group during 2010, increasing the number of Conservative seats to 61. The collective group of the Lincolnshire Independents, the Boston Bypass Party and other independent councillors formed the opposition for the four-year term.

2013 County Council elections 
In the 2013 County Council elections, the Conservatives lost their overall majority and formed a coalition with the Liberal Democrats and independents. The UK Independence Party made significant gains from the Conservatives, particularly around the town of Boston, due to opposition to Eastern European immigration.

UKIP were initially the main opposition party with 16 councillors, but six members broke away to form a separate group, UKIP Lincolnshire.

2017 County Council elections 
The 2017 Lincolnshire County Council election took place on 4 May 2017 and saw a local landslide victory for the Conservatives, who won 58 out of the 70 seats. UKIP was left without a single seat. Labour lost four seats, reducing their number of seats to six, the Liberal Democrats were reduced to one seat, and the Lincolnshire Independents were also reduced to a single seat after losing eight seats. Four other independents were elected.

National referendums

1975 EC membership referendum 

The 1975 EC membership referendum was the first major referendum to be held in the county, and saw one of the largest majority votes in favour of continued membership of the then European Communities (which would later become the European Union) within non-metropolitan Lincolnshire and also Humberside, which then included northern parts of historic Lincolnshire. The referendum was held on 5 June 1975 with votes within the county being centrally counted under the provisions of the Referendum Act 1975 where voters were asked to decide on the question “Do you think that the United Kingdom should stay in the European Community (the Common Market)?” by voting for either “Yes” or “No”. The result was declared on the following day.

 The result above only includes non-Metropolitan Lincolnshire as parts of historic northern Lincolnshire made up part of Humberside at the time.

2011 AV referendum 

The 2011 United Kingdom Alternative Vote referendum was the first to be held in Lincolnshire since the 1975 EC membership referendum and was only the second time that the people of Lincolnshire have been asked to vote in a referendum. The referendum asked voters whether to replace the present "first-past-the-post" (simple plurality) system with the "alternative vote" (AV) method for electing MPs to the House of Commons in future general elections. The proposal to introduce AV was overwhelmingly rejected by voters with all eight counting areas within Lincolnshire returning significant "no" votes.

 The result above includes all areas within historic Lincolnshire

The seven shire-districts and two unitary authorities in Lincolnshire were used as the voting areas.

2016 EU membership referendum 

On 23 June 2016, in the EU referendum, the people of Lincolnshire voted for the second time on the issue of the UK's continued membership of what is now known as the European Union under the provisions of the European Union Referendum Act 2015 where voters were asked to decide on the question “Should the United Kingdom remain a member of the European Union or leave the European Union” by voting for either “Remain a member of the European Union” or “Leave the European Union”. Of the ten MPs which represented the historic county at the time six MPs Andrew Percy, Martin Vickers, Edward Leigh, Karl McCartney, Stephen Phillips and John Hayes supported a "Leave" vote with five MPs Matt Warman, Nick Boles, Victoria Atkins, Melanie Onn and Nic Dakin supported a "Remain" vote.

 The result above includes all areas within historic Lincolnshire

The seven shire-districts and two unitary authorities in Lincolnshire were used as the voting areas.

Police and Crime Commissioners 

The most recent elections for Police and Crime Commissioners within the Lincolnshire and Humberside police force areas took place on 5 May 2016.

Lincolnshire Police

Humberside Police

References 

Politics of Lincolnshire